Lead Mine is an unincorporated community in Tucker County, West Virginia, United States.

The community was named after nearby Leadmine Run creek.

References 

Unincorporated communities in West Virginia
Unincorporated communities in Tucker County, West Virginia